The Amazing Chan and the Chan Clan (sometimes abbreviated as The Amazing Chan Clan) is an American animated television series produced by Hanna-Barbera Productions, animated by Eric Porter Studios in Australia and broadcast on CBS from September 9, 1972, to December 30, 1972, with reruns continuing through the summer of 1973 and in syndication from 1976 to 1982. The show was loosely based on the Charlie Chan series of mystery novels and films, which began with the 1925 novel The House Without a Key.

Throughout the series, legendary Chinese sleuth Charlie Chan is alternately impeded and assisted by his brood of ten children and their dog Chu Chu, in the process of solving mysteries and catching wily master criminals. The family travels around the world in the Chan Van, a vehicle built by teenage genius Alan Chan, which can transform itself with the push of a button. While solving mysteries, the Chan kids break off into small groups with Henry and Stanley, the two oldest children, being paired together and driving the Chan Van. To ostensibly aid in their detective work, Stanley usually changes into some sort of goofy disguise much to the chagrin of his older brother Henry. As in other Hanna-Barbera cartoons of the period, the kids also have a music group, the Chan Clan, and they perform a song in each episode.

Voice cast
As the voice of the title character, Keye Luke is (to date) the only actor of Chinese ancestry to play the part in any screen adaptation. Luke had previously portrayed "Number One Son" Lee Chan opposite Warner Oland whose characterization had a relatively limited vocabulary in the long-running Charlie Chan film series of the 1930s and 1940s by 20th Century Fox and later, Monogram Pictures.

Early on, it was decided that most of the children's accents were too thick for American audiences to understand, and all of the characters except Henry and Alan were recast. Once the new cast was in place, earlier episodes were re-dubbed.

Episodes

Production

Music
Don Kirshner produced the songs for the show as he did for The Monkees and The Archie Show. Singer Ron Dante supplies the singing voice of Stanley as he did for Archie on The Archie Show.

Marketing and other media
A board game, jigsaw puzzle, lunch box with thermos, and comic book series were released as licensed merchandise alongside the animated series.

Comic book

At about the same time that the show came out, Gold Key Comics produced a comic book series based on the program, with artwork by Warren Tufts; it only lasted four issues. The first issue (an adaptation of the first episode) was written by Mark Evanier and was his first comic book printed in English.

Home media
On June 19, 2012, Warner Archive released The Amazing Chan and the Chan Clan: The Complete Series on DVD in region 1 as part of their Hanna–Barbera Classics Collection. This is a manufacture-on-demand (MOD) release, available through Warner's online store and Amazon.com.

Other media appearances
 The Chans appear in an episode of Harvey Birdman, Attorney at Law, as a Japanese band called "Shoyu Weenie", with Mr. Chan as their semi-tyrannical band manager, who sued another band ("The Neptunes" from the Jabberjaw animated series) for plagiarism. Shoyu Weenie only spoke Japanese, although the original characters are Chinese.
 In episodes from Krypto the Superdog including "Up, Up, and Away!", Mimi Chan is in Kevin's class on the field trip to LexCorp.
 A high school student resembling Suzie Chan appears in three season 1 episodes of Scooby-Doo! Mystery Incorporated.
 The Chans will appear in the HBO Max original series Jellystone!

See also
 List of works produced by Hanna-Barbera Productions

References

External links
 
 The Amazing Chan and the Chan Clan at the Big Cartoon DataBase
 The Amazing Chan and the Chan Clan at Don Markstein's Toonopedia. Archived from the original on April 4, 2012.
 Episode list and voice actor info from Epguides.com
 Amazing Chan & The Chan Clan Episodes On Veoh

1970s American animated television series
1972 American television series debuts
1972 American television series endings
American children's animated mystery television series
Animated television series about children
CBS original programming
English-language television shows
Gold Key Comics titles
Television series by Hanna-Barbera
Works based on Charlie Chan
Chinese American television